This is the complete list of Olympic medalists in tug of war from 1900 to 1920.

See also
Tug of war at the 1906 Intercalated Games — these Intercalated Games are no longer regarded as official Games by the International Olympic Committee, although they were at the time.
Tug of war at the Summer Olympics
Lists of Olympic medalists

References

Tug of war
Tug of war at the Summer Olympics
List